Tatsuo Miyao (22 February 1928 – 24 February 2015) was a Japanese cross-country skier. He competed in the men's 15 kilometre event at the 1956 Winter Olympics.

References

1928 births
2015 deaths
Japanese male cross-country skiers
Olympic cross-country skiers of Japan
Cross-country skiers at the 1956 Winter Olympics
Sportspeople from Niigata Prefecture